The 2008 World U-17 Hockey Challenge was an ice hockey tournament held in London, Lucan, St. Thomas, Stratford, Strathroy, and Woodstock, Ontario, Canada between December 29, 2007 and January 4, 2008. The venues used for the tournament included the John Labatt Centre and Western Fair Sports Centre in London, the Lucan Community Memorial Centre in Lucan, the Gemini Sportsplex in Strathroy, the Timken Community Complex in St. Thomas, the Rotary Complex in Stratford, and the Southwood Community Complex in Woodstock. Team Canada Ontario defeated the United States 3–0 to win the gold medal, while team Canada West defeated team Canada Pacific 9–6 to win the bronze medal.

Challenge results

Preliminary round

Group A

Results

Group B

Results

Final round

Semifinals

9th place game

7th place game

5th place game

Bronze medal game

Gold medal game

Final standings

Scoring leaders

Goaltending leaders
(Minimum 60 minutes played)

Tournament awards

All-Star team
Goaltender:  Philipp Grubauer
Defensemen:  Ontario Ryan Ellis,  Cam Fowler
Forwards:  Ontario Matt Duchene,  Toni Rajala,  West Brayden Schenn

See also
2008 IIHF World U18 Championships
2008 World Junior Ice Hockey Championships

References

External links
Official website

U-17
U-17
U-17
U-17
U-17
U-17
U-17
U-17 World Hockey Challenge 2008
World U-17 Hockey Challenge
International ice hockey competitions hosted by Canada